The 1989 FINA Men's Water Polo World Cup was the sixth edition of the event, organised by the world's governing body in aquatics, the International Swimming Federation (FINA). The event took place in Berlin, West Germany. Eight teams participated to decide the winner of what would be a bi-annual event until 1999.

Final ranking

References

1989
F
W
1989
1980s in West Berlin
1989 in Berlin
1989 in West Germany
Sports competitions in West Berlin